Blu Basket 1971 is an Italian professional basketball team located in Treviglio, Bergamo. Established in 1971, the team competes in Italy's Serie A2 Basket league.

Notable players

 Matteo Formenti 
 Francesco Ihedioha 
 Bryce Douvier 
 Tomas Kyzlink 
 Bojan Krstović
 Jamal Olasewere

References

External links
Presentation at Eurobasket.com
Presentation at facebook.com

Basketball teams in Lombardy
Province of Bergamo
Basketball teams established in 1971